Rapala dieneces, the scarlet flash, is a species of lycaenid or blue butterfly first described by William Chapman Hewitson in 1878. It is found in Myanmar, northern India, Assam, Bengal, Malaya, Singapore, Sumatra, Borneo, Nias and the Philippines.

References

External links
 With images.

Rapala (butterfly)
Fauna of Pakistan
Butterflies of Asia
Butterflies of Singapore
Butterflies of Borneo